Edward Rombo is a Kenyan former rugby union and rugby league footballer. He was one of the few Kenya rugby players to turn professional, when he moved to Leeds Rhinos in 1990.

Playing career
Rombo was born in 1967 in Nairobi, Kenya. He started playing rugby union when he moved to Nairobi School for secondary school education, where he captained the 1986 school side. During his school years he also played for Barclays RFC, which won the Kenya Cup in 1987. After leaving school, he enrolled in the University of Nairobi, where he joined Mean Machine RFC.

On a trip to Singapore with the Watembezi Pacesetters VII he was awarded the player of the tournament, and soon after was signed by English rugby league club Leeds. He also went on to play for Dewsbury and Featherstone Rovers.

There have only been a few other players from Kenya that have played overseas, such as Benjamin Ayimba and Oscar Osir, who both had stints with the Cornish Pirates from 2005 to 2006 and Lucas Onyango who played for various professional rugby league clubs including Widnes Vikings. Teddy Omondi and Derrick Wamalwa also played professional rugby in France for Racing Club of Paris. Wamalwa was forced to retire due to knee injury. Omondi however continues and has just secured a new three-year contract. Willy Ambaka has also secured a pro-contract in France where he plies his trade. He took the opportunity to attend the University of Leeds and gain a degree in law.

He returned to Kenya in 1999, and played for Mwamba RFC between 1999 and 2003. Rombo later served as assistant coach for Kenya 7s and as a director on the Kenya Rugby Football Union Board from 2010 to 2012. He then retired and is now the Mwamba RFC coach.

Managerial career
In 2020, Rombo was named head coach of the Kenya national rugby league team.

References

External links
Statistics at rugbyleagueproject.org

1967 births
Living people
Alumni of Nairobi School
Alumni of the University of Leeds
Dewsbury Rams players
Expatriate rugby league players in England
Expatriate rugby union players in England
Featherstone Rovers players
Kenya national rugby league team coaches
Kenyan expatriate rugby league players
Kenyan expatriate rugby union players
Kenyan expatriate sportspeople in England
Kenyan rugby league players
Kenyan rugby union players
Leeds Rhinos players
University of Nairobi alumni